Mi corazón es tuyo is a Mexican telenovela produced by Juan Osorio for Televisa, which is transmitted by El Canal de las Estrellas. The telenovela is an adaptation of the Spanish telenovela Ana y los 7. It is adapted in Mexico by Alejandro Pohlenz, Marcia del Río and Pablo Ferrer.

Series overview

Episodes

Episodes 1—19

Episodes 20—39

Episodes 40—59

Episodes 60—79

Episodes 80—99

Episodes 100—139

Episodes 140—159

Episodes 160—176

Special episodes

Extras

References 

Lists of Mexican drama television series episodes